Kavakköy can refer to:

 Kavakköy
 Kavakköy, Bayramören
 Kavakköy, Çivril
 Kavakköy, Dursunbey
 Kavakköy, Kovancılar
 Kavakköy, Sivrice